Analysis of the Personality of Adolph Hitler: With Predictions of His Future Behavior and Suggestions for Dealing with Him Now and After Germany's Surrender was a report prepared by Henry A. Murray for the United States Office of Strategic Services during World War II. It was one of two psychoanalytic reports prepared for the OSS on Nazi Germany leader Adolf Hitler; the other was "A Psychological Analysis of Adolph Hitler: His Life and Legend" (later published in book form under the title The Mind of Adolf Hitler).

Murray's report is dated October 1943. A copy in PDF is available from the Cornell Law School library, which received copyright permission to publish the report online from Murray's family in 2004. The Cornell copy is serialized as copy number 3 of 30. The report forms a part of the law library's Donovan Collection, which contains the papers of the OSS chief William J. Donovan.

History
Murray prepared the report, which consists of the following:

6 unnumbered pages of Introductory Material (consisting of a cover page, a foreword and a table of contents)
Section 1 (pages numbered 1-53) entitled a  Condensed Review of the Entire Memorandum, which contains
Part A (pages 1–29), Brief Analysis of Hitler's Personality
Part B (pages 29 – 33), Predictions of Hitler's Behavior
Part C (pages 33 – 38), Suggestions for the Treatment of Hitler
Part D (pages 38 – 53), Suggestions for the Treatment of the German People
Section 2, a work by W.H.D. Vernon (numbered as pages 54 – 81) entitled Hitler the Man - Notes for a Case Study
Section 3 (numbered as pages 82 – 227) appearing here, which is intended for "psychologists and psychiatrists."

The sources for the report, identified in the introductory material, are all published sources, including the paper which was prepared by Vernon (Section 2) under Murray's general supervision. Unlike the report prepared by Langer (see The Mind of Adolf Hitler), Murray conducted no personal interviews of Hitler associates.

There is some overlap between the two wartime reports. Murray's biographer asserts that Langer copied from Murray without crediting his work.

Footnotes

Reference Works

External links
 Murray, Henry A. (1943) Analysis of the Personality of Adolph Hitler: With Predictions of His Future Behavior and Suggestions for Dealing with Him Now and After Germany's Surrender at Donovan Nuremberg Trials Collection, Cornell University Law Library
 Murray, Henry A. (1943) Analysis of the Personality of Adolph Hitler: With Predictions of His Future Behavior and Suggestions for Dealing with Him Now and After Germany's Surrender at archive.org

Academic works about psychoanalysis
Reports of the United States government
Office of Strategic Services
Intelligence reports
Offender profiling
Works about Adolf Hitler
Psychological studies of Adolf Hitler
1943 documents